Ceriporiopsis is a genus of fungi in the family Phanerochaetaceae. The genus is widely distributed, and, according to a 2008 estimate,  contains about 25 species. Ceriporiopsis was circumscribed in 1963 by Polish mycologist Stanislaw Domanski. The genus is a wastebasket taxon, containing "species that share common macroscopic and microscopic characteristics, but are not necessarily related." Ceriporiopsis species are crust fungi that cause a white rot. They have a monomitic hyphal system, containing only generative hyphae, and these hyphae have clamp connections.

Species
Ceriporiopsis alboaurantia C.L.Zhao, B.K.Cui & Y.C.Dai (2014) – China
Ceriporiopsis albonigrescens Núñez, Parmasto & Ryvarden (2001)
Ceriporiopsis allantosporus Ryvarden (2016) – Colombia
Ceriporiopsis aurantitingens (Corner) T.Hatt. (2002)
Ceriporiopsis balaenae Niemelä (1985)
Ceriporiopsis carnegiae (D.V.Baxter) Gilb. & Ryvarden (1985)
Ceriporiopsis cerussata (Bres.) Ryvarden (1988)
Ceriporiopsis cinnamomea Ryvarden, Gomes-Silva & Gibertoni (2016) – Brazil
Ceriporiopsis consobrina (Bres.) Ryvarden (1988)
Ceriporiopsis coprosmae (G.Cunn.) P.K.Buchanan & Ryvarden (1988)
Ceriporiopsis costaricensis M.Mata & Ryvarden (2010)
Ceriporiopsis cremea (Parmasto) Ryvarden (1986)
Ceriporiopsis cremeicarnea (Corner) T.Hatt. (2002)
Ceriporiopsis cystidiata Log.-Leite, G.V.C.Gonç. & Ryvarden (2001)
Ceriporiopsis dentata Ryvarden (2016) – Mexico
Ceriporiopsis egula C.J.Yu & Y.C.Dai (2007)
Ceriporiopsis fimbriata C.L.Zhao & Y.C.Dai (2015)
Ceriporiopsis flavilutea (Murrill) Ryvarden (1985)
Ceriporiopsis gilvescens (Bres.) Domański (1963)
Ceriporiopsis guidella Bernicchia & Ryvarden (2003)
Ceriporiopsis herbicola Fortey & Ryvarden (2007)
Ceriporiopsis hydnoidea Ryvarden & Iturr. (2004)
Ceriporiopsis hypolateritius  (Berk. ex Cooke) Ryvarden (2015)
Ceriporiopsis irregularis  Ryvarden (2016) – Venezuela
Ceriporiopsis jelicii (Tortič & A.David) Ryvarden & Gilb. (1993)
Ceriporiopsis jensii Læssøe & Ryvarden (2010)
Ceriporiopsis kunmingensis C.L.Zhao (2016) – China
Ceriporiopsis lagerheimii Læssøe & Ryvarden (2010) – Ecuador, China
Ceriporiopsis lavendula  B.K.Cui (2013)
Ceriporiopsis lowei Rajchenb. (1987)
Ceriporiopsis merulinus (Berk.) Rajchenb. (2003)
Ceriporiopsis microporus T.T.Chang & W.N.Chou (1999)
Ceriporiopsis mucida (Pers.) Gilb. & Ryvarden (1985)
Ceriporiopsis namibiensis Leif Ryvarden (2016) – Namibia
Ceriporiopsis nigra Ryvarden (2001)
Ceriporiopsis obscura Ryvarden (2000)
Ceriporiopsis portcrosensis (A.David) Ryvarden & Gilb. (1993)
Ceriporiopsis pseudoplacenta Vlasák & Ryvarden (2012)
Ceriporiopsis resinascens (Romell) Domański (1963)
Ceriporiopsis rosea C.L.Zhao & Y.C.Dai (2015)
Ceriporiopsis semisupina C.L.Zhao, B.K.Cui & Y.C.Dai (2014) – China
Ceriporiopsis subsphaerospora (A.David) M.Pieri & B.Rivoire (1996)
Ceriporiopsis subvermispora (Pilát) Gilb. & Ryvarden (1985)
Ceriporiopsis umbrinescens (Murrill) Ryvarden (1985)
Ceriporiopsis vinosa Ryvarden (2004)

References

Phanerochaetaceae
Polyporales genera
Taxa described in 1963